Margherita Joan (Miggy) Biller  is a British mathematics teacher, the head of mathematics at York College. She was named an MBE in the 2016 New Year Honours "for services to mathematics in further education".

Biller taught mathematics at St Peter's School, York before moving to York College in 1988. At York College, she taught mathematics prodigy Daniel Lightwing, after whom the main character of the film X+Y was modeled.
Her husband, Peter Biller, is a historian at the University of York.

References

Year of birth missing (living people)
Living people
British mathematicians
Women mathematicians
Members of the Order of the British Empire